Margaret River is a river in Western Australia.

Margaret River may also refer to:

Places

Australia

Northern Territory
 Margaret River, Northern Territory, a locality

Western Australia
Margaret River, Western Australia, town 
Margaret River (wine region), a wine region
Margaret River (Kimberley, Western Australia), a river

Events
Margaret River Pro, a surfing competition held in Western Australia

See also 
 Margaret (disambiguation)
 Margaret Creek, a stream and state waterway in Athens and Meigs Counties, Ohio
 Shire of Augusta-Margaret River